The Battle of Lillo was a naval battle that took place during the Eighty Years' War. A Dutch fleet under the command of  defeated a Spanish fleet at anchor between the fortresses of Lillo and  near Antwerp. The Spanish lost ten ships which were captured by the Dutch.

Naval battles of the Eighty Years' War
Battles involving Flanders
1574 in military history
Eighty Years' War (1566–1609)